Environmental journalism is the collection, verification, production, distribution and exhibition of information regarding current events, trends, and issues associated with the non-human world. To be an environmental journalist, one must have an understanding of scientific language. The individual needs to put to use their knowledge of historical environmental events. One must have the ability to follow environmental policy decisions and environmental organizations. An environmental journalist should have a general understanding of current environmental concerns, and the ability to communicate information to the public in a way that is easily understood.

Environmental journalism falls within the scope of environmental communication. Its roots can be traced to nature writing. One controversy in environmental journalism is, how to distinguish the genre from its allied disciplines.

History 

While the practice of nature writing has a rich history that dates back at least as far as the exploration narratives of Christopher Columbus, and follows tradition up through prominent nature writers like Ralph Waldo Emerson and Henry David Thoreau in the late 19th century, John Burroughs and John Muir in the early 20th century, and Aldo Leopold in the 1940s, the field of environmental journalism did not begin to take shape until the 1960s and 1970s.

The growth of environmental journalism as a profession roughly parallels that of the environmental movement, which became a mainstream cultural movement with the publication of Rachel Carson's Silent Spring in 1962 and was further legitimized by the passage of the Wilderness Act in 1964.  Grassroots environmental organizations made a booming appearance on the political scene in the 1960s and 1970s, raising public awareness of what many considered to be the "environmental crisis", and working to influence environmental policy decisions.  The mass media has followed and generated public interest on environmental issues ever since.

The field of environmental journalism was further legitimized by the creation of the Society of Environmental Journalists  in 1990, whose mission "is to advance public understanding of environmental issues by improving the quality, accuracy, and visibility of environmental reporting."   Today, academic programs are offered at a number of institutions to train budding journalists in the rigors, complexity and sheer breadth of environmental journalism.

Advocacy debate

There exists a minor rift in the community of environmental journalists.  Some, including those in the Society of Environmental Journalists, believe in objectively reporting environmental news, while others, like Michael Frome, a prominent figure in the field, believe that journalists should only enter the environmental side of the field if saving the planet is a personal passion, and that environmental journalists should not shy away from environmental advocacy, though not at the expense of clearly relating facts and opinions on all sides of an issue.   This debate is not likely to be settled soon, but with changes in the field of journalism filtering up from new media being used by the general public to produce news, it seems likely that the field of environmental journalism will lend itself more and more toward reporting points of view akin to environmental advocacy.

Genres

Environmental communication 

Environmental communication is all of the forms of communication that are engaged with the social debate about environmental issues and problems.

Also within the scope of environmental communication are the genres of nature writing, science writing, environmental literature, environmental interpretation and environmental advocacy.  While there is a great deal of overlap among the various genres within environmental communication, they are each deserving of their own definition.

Nature writing

Nature writing is the genre with the longest history in environmental communication. In his book, This Incomparable Land: A Guide to American Nature Writing, Thomas J. Lyon attempts to use a "taxonomy of nature writing" in order to define the genre.  He suggests that his classifications, too, suffer a great deal of overlap and intergrading. "The literature of nature has three main dimensions to it: natural history information, personal responses to nature, and philosophical interpretation of nature" (Lyon 20). In the natural history essay, "the main burden of the writing is to convey pointed instruction in the facts of nature," such as with the ramble-type nature writing of John Burroughs (Lyon 21). "In essays of experience, the author's firsthand contact with nature is the frame for the writing," as with Edward Abbey's contemplation of a desert sunset (Lyon 23). In the philosophical interpretation of nature, the content is similar to that of the natural history and personal experience essays, "but the mode of presentation tends to be more abstract and scholarly" (Lyon 25). The Norton Book of Nature Writing adds a few new dimensions to the genre of nature writing, including animal narratives, garden essays, farming essays, ecofeminist works, writing on environmental justice, and works advocating environmental preservation, sustainability and biological diversity.  Environmental journalism pulls from the tradition and scope of nature writing.

Science writing

Science writing is writing that focuses specifically on topics of scientific study, generally translating jargon that is difficult for those outside a particular scientific field to understand into language that is easily digestible.  This genre can be narrative or informative.  Not all science writing falls within the bounds of environmental communication, only science writing that takes on topics relevant to the environment. Environmental journalism also pulls from the tradition and scope of science writing.

Environmental interpretation

Environmental interpretation is a particular format for the communication of relevant information.  It "involves translating the technical language of a natural science or related field into terms and ideas that people who aren't scientists can readily understand.  And it involves doing it in a way that's entertaining and interesting to these people" (Ham 3). Environmental interpretation is pleasurable (to engage an audience in the topic and inspire them to learn more about it), relevant (meaningful and personal to the audience so that they have an intrinsic reason to learn more about the topic), organized (easy to follow and structured so that main points are likely to be remembered) and thematic (the information is related to a specific, repetitious message) (Ham 8–28). While environmental journalism is not derived from environmental interpretation, it can employ interpretive techniques to explain difficult concepts to its audience.

Environmental literature

Environmental literature is writing that comments intelligently on environmental themes, particularly as applied to the relationships between man, society and the environment.  Most nature writing and some science writing falls within the scope of environmental literature.  Often, environmental literature is understood to espouse care and concern for the environment, thus advocating a more thoughtful and ecologically sensitive relationship of man to nature.  Environmental journalism is partially derived from environmental literature

Environmental advocacy

Environmental advocacy is presenting information on nature and environmental issues that is decidedly opinionated and encourages its audience to adopt more environmentally sensitive attitudes, often more biocentric worldviews.  Environmental advocacy can be present in any of the aforementioned genres of environmental communication.  It is currently debated whether environmental journalism should employ techniques of environmental advocacy.

Topics

The field of environmental journalism covers a wide variety of topics.  According to The Reporter's Environmental Handbook, environmental journalists perceive water concerns as the most important environmental issue, followed by atmospheric air pollution concerns, endocrine disruptors, and waste management issues.  The journalists surveyed were more likely to prioritize specific, local environmental issues than global environmental concerns.

Environmental journalism can include, but is not limited to, some of the following topics:

From The Reporter's Environmental Handbook:

 Air pollution (Outdoor)
 Air pollution (Indoor)
 Animal waste management
 Biodiversity
 Brownfields ("former industrial and commercial sites" (104))
 Cancer and other disease cluster claims
 Chemical emergencies
 Chemical weapons (Disarmament)
 Children's health (Asthma)
 Children's health (Lead)
 Cross-border environmental issues (U.S.-Mexico)
 Dioxin
 Disposal of dredged materials
 Endocrine disruptors ("also called a hormonally active agent, [it] is a chemical that interferes with the functioning of the endocrine system" (172))
 Environmental justice and hazardous waste
 Food irradiation
 Genetically modified crops
 Global warming and climate change
 Groundwater pollution
 Naturally occurring and technology-based disasters
 Occupational health
 Ozone depletion
 Pesticides
 Population growth
 Sprawl and environmental health
 Surface water quality
 Water supply

From EnviroLink:

 Agriculture
 Air quality
 Climate change
 Ecosystems
 Energy
 Environmental disasters
 Environmental economics
 Environmental education
 Environmental ethics
 Environmental legislation and environmental policy
 Forests
 Ground pollution
 Habitat conservation
 Natural history
 Outdoor recreation
 Population
 Sciences
 Social Sciences and humanities
 Sustainable development
 Sustainable living
 Transportation
 Urban issues
 Vegetarianism
 Waste management
 Water quality
 Wildlife

See also

 Advocacy journalism
 Conservation Commons
 Conservation movement
 Dean v. Utica
 Ecology
 Ecology movement
 Ecopoetry
 Environmental communication
 Environmental movement
 Environmental science
 Environmentalism
 European Environmental Press (EEP)
 Grantham Prize for Excellence in Reporting on the Environment
 Journal of Environmental Economics and Management
 Journalism
 Journalism ethics and standards
 List of environment topics
 List of environmental periodicals
 Lists of environmental publications
 Objectivity (journalism)
 Objectivity (philosophy) main article discussing the concept of objectivity in various fields (history, science, journalism, philosophy, etc.)
 Outline of environmental journalism
 Science journalism

References

Notes

Further reading 
 Anderson, Alison. Media, Culture and the Environment. Taylor and Francis, Inc., 1997. 
 Beck, Larry and Ted Cable. Interpretation for the 21st Century: Fifteen Guiding Principles for Interpreting Nature and Culture. 2nd ed. Champaign: Sagamore Publishing, 2002. 
 Blum, Deborah, Robin Marantz Henig, and Mary Knudson. A Field Guide for Science Writers: The Official Guide of the National Association of Science Writers. 2nd ed. Oxford University Press, 2005. 
  
 Buell, Lawrence. The Environmental Imagination: Thoreau, Nature Writing, and the Formation of American Culture. Cambridge and London: The Belknap Press of Harvard University Press, 1995. 
 Chapman, Graham, Keval Kumar, Caroline Fraser, and Ivor Gaber. Environmentalism and the Mass Media. New York and London: Routledge, 1997. 
 Covering the Green Beat in Asia Beritalingkungan.com
 Dobson, Andrew. The Green Reader: Essays Toward a Sustainable Society. Mercury House, 1991. 
 EnviroLink. Accessed 11 Oct. 2005. <http://www.envirolink.org>
 Finch, Howard and John Elder. Eds. The Norton Book of Nature Writing. College Ed. New York and London: W.W. Norton & Company, 2002. 
 Frome, Michael. Green Ink. Salt Lake City: University of Utah Press, 1998. 
 Goldstein, Eric A. and Mark Izeman. The New York Environment Book. Island Press, 1990. 
 Ham, Sam. Environmental Interpretation: A Practical Guide for People with Big Ideas and Small Budgets. Golden: North American Press, 1992. 
 Hanson, Anders, ed. The Mass Media and Environmental Issues. London and New York: Leicester University Press, 1993. 
 Kamrin, Michael A., Dolores J. Katz, and Martha L. Walter. Reporting on Risk: A Journalist's Handbook. 3rd ed. Michigan Sea Grant College Program, 1999. 
 Lamay, Craig L.L. and Everette E. Dennis, eds. Media and the Environment. Island Press, 1991. 
 Lyon, Thomas J. This Incomparable Land: A Guide to American Nature Writing. Minneapolis: Milkweed Editions, 2001. 
 Nash, Roderick Frazier. Wilderness and the American Mind. 4th ed. New Haven and London: Yale University Press, 2001. 
 Neuzil, Mark and William Kovairk. Mass Media and Environmental Conflict: America's Green Crusades. Thousand Oaks, London and New Delhi: SAGE Publications, 1996. 
 Palen, John. "Objectivity as Independence: Creating the Society of Environmental Journalists, 1989-1997." Proceedings of the National Convention of the Association for Education in Journalism and Mass Communications, August 1998. Society of Environmental Journalists. 28 Sept. 2005 <https://web.archive.org/web/20090419012719/http://www.sej.org/about/index2.htm>.
 Society of Environmental Journalists. 2005. Accessed 11 Oct. 2005. <http://www.sej.org>
 West, Bernadette M., M. Jane Lewis, Michael R. Greenburg, David B. Sachsman, and Renée M. Rogers. The Reporter's Environmental Handbook. 3rd ed. New Brunswick and London: Rutgers University Press, 2003.

External links
 Association of Environmental Journalists  Greenpress Indonesia
 what is green journalism?
 Xover Environment Magazine
 Society of Environmental Journalists
 Environmental Journalism Infosite 
 Center for Environmental Journalism at the University of Colorado, Boulder
 Environmental Communication Network (ECN)
 environmental journalist news sites in Indonesia Beritalingkungan.com
 Environment Writer
 Knight Center for Environmental Journalism at Michigan State University
 Metcalf Institute for Marine and Environmental Reporting
 Science, Health and Environmental Reporting Program at New York University
 Course Module Overview on Environmental Journalism at Open School of Journalism
 Cascadia Times
 The Yale Forum on Climate Change & The Media
 The Journalist's Toolbox: Environment
 FAIR Issue Area: Environment by Fairness and Accuracy in Reporting
 Earth Journalism Network

Journalism by field
Journalism
Environmental interpretation
Environmental communication